Rubielos de la Cérida is a municipality located in the province of Teruel, Aragon, Spain. According to the 2010 census the municipality had a population of 45 inhabitants. Its postal code is 44166

See also
Rubielos de la Cérida impact structure
Jiloca Comarca
List of municipalities in Teruel

References

External links

 Rubielos de la Cérida in Comarca del Jiloca
Rubielos de la Cérida site

Municipalities in the Province of Teruel